is a Japanese film director.

Filmography
 2001 Nights (anime): Assistant Director 
 Amagami SS: Storyboard (episode 20) 
 Anohana: The Flower We Saw That Day: Storyboard (episodes 2, 10), Episode Director (ep 10)
 Another (anime): Storyboard (episode 8), Episode Director (episode 8)
 Banner of the Stars: Storyboard (episode 3)
 Basilisk: Storyboard (episodes 12, 17)
 Black Butler: Director, Storyboard (OP,ED), Episode Director (OP,ED)
 Black Rock Shooter: Storyboard (episode 3), Episode Director (episode 3)
 Crest of the Stars: Storyboard (episodes 2, 6, 10), Unit Director (episodes 2, 6, 10)
 EX-Driver: Storyboard (episodes 4–6), Dramatization
 Fushigi Yugi: Episode Director (episode 10)
 Gamba to Kawauso no Boken (movie): Assistant Director
 Gintama': Storyboard (episode 46)
 Gunparade Orchestra (TV): Director
 Gurren Lagann: Episode Director (episode 18)
 Hanasaku Iroha: Storyboard (5 episodes), Episode Director (episodes 11, 18, 24)
 Harukanaru Toki no Naka de 3 (video game): Director
 Higurashi no Naku Koro ni: Storyboard
 Hitohira: Episode Director (episode 9)
 Inuyasha the Movie: Affections Touching Across Time: Director, Continuity
 Inuyasha the Movie: The Castle Beyond the Looking Glass: Director, Continuity, Production Director
 Inuyasha the Movie: Swords of an Honorable Ruler: Director, Storyboard, Sequence Director
 Inuyasha the Movie: Fire on the Mystic Island: Director, Storyboard
 Iroduku: The World in Colors: Director
 Kids on the Slope: Storyboard (episode 4)
 Kishin Taisen Gigantic Formula: Storyboard (episodes 20, 24)
 Last Exile: Fam, the Silver Wing: Episode Director (episode 9)
 Legend of the Galactic Heroes: Storyboard
 Level E: Storyboard (episode 11), Episode Director (episode 11)
 Lupin III: Bye Bye Liberty Crisis (special): Assistant Director
 Lupin III: Crisis in Tokyo (special): Director, Storyboard
 Lupin III: Dead or Alive (movie): Storyboard, Co-Director
 Lupin III: Hemingway Papers (special): Assistant Director
 Lupin III: The Legend of the Gold of Babylon (movie): Production Advancement
 Magic Knight Rayearth 2: Storyboard (episode 32)
 Nagi-Asu: A Lull in the Sea: Director
 Natsume's Book of Friends: Storyboard (episode 1)
 Oniisama E...: Episode Director (episode 10)
 RDG Red Data Girl: Director
 Samurai Deeper Kyo: Episode Director (episode 1)
 Soreike! Anpanman: Yuuki no Hana ga Hiraku toki (movie): Director, Storyboard
 The Aquatope on White Sand: Director
 The Book of Bantorra: Director, Storyboard (5 episodes), Episode Director (episode 27)
 The Boy Who Saw the Wind (movie): Animation Director
 The Diary of Anne Frank (movie): Assistant Director

References

External links
 

1959 births
Anime directors
Japanese film directors
Living people